The 1999–2000 season was the 121st season in Bolton Wanderers F.C.'s existence, and their second successive season in the Football League First Division. It covers the period from 1 July 1999 to 30 June 2000.

Results

Nationwide League Division One

Nationwide League Division One play-offs

F.A. Cup

Worthington Cup

Appearances
Bolton used a total of 30 players during the season.

Top scorers

References

 

1999-2000
Bol